The Hyundai i20 N Rally1 is a Rally1 car built by the Hyundai Motorsport that is driven in the World Rally Championship starting in . The prototype car is based on the Hyundai i20 N production car and was first revealed to public during testing in the south of France in May 2021.

World Rally Championship results

WRC victories

Rally results

Complete World Rally Championship results

* Season still in progress.

References

External links

Hyundai i20 N Rally1 at eWRC-results.com

Rally1 cars
All-wheel-drive vehicles
i20 N Rally1